Eucalyptus camfieldii, commonly known as Camfield's stringybark or heart-leaved stringybark, is a species of mallee or small tree that is endemic to New South Wales. It has rough, fibrous and stringy bark, broadly lance-shaped adult leaves, flower buds in groups of about eleven, white flowers and flattened hemispherical fruit. It grows in poor, sandy soil in the Sydney region.

Description
It has persistent, grey or brownish, stringy and fibrous bark. Flowering mainly occurs from August to November and the flowers are white.

Taxonomy and naming
Eucalyptus camfieldii was first formally described in 1920 by Joseph Maiden and the description was published in Journal and Proceedings of the Royal Society of New South Wales from a specimen collected near Middle Harbour. The specific epithet ( camfieldii) honours Julius Henry Camfield (1852–1916), who worked in the Royal Botanic Garden, Sydney from 1882 until 1916.

Distribution and habitat
Camfield's stringybark is restricted to poor, shallow sandy soil on ridges and some headlands between the Norah Head and Waterfall in New South Wales.

Conservation status
This eucalypt is classified as "vulnerable" under the Australian Government Environment Protection and Biodiversity Conservation Act 1999 and the New South Wales Government Biodiversity Conservation Act 2016. The main threats to the species are loss of habitat due to land clearing, inappropriate fire regimes and weed invasion.

References

camfieldii
Myrtales of Australia
Flora of New South Wales
Trees of Australia
Plants described in 1920
Taxa named by Joseph Maiden